Bolton Percy is a village and civil parish in the Selby District of North Yorkshire, England. According to the 2001 census it had a population of 305 in 115 households, reducing marginally to 304 at the 2011 census.

The village was historically part of the West Riding of Yorkshire until 1974.

History

Following the Norman Conquest, when William de Malet served as the county's first High Sheriff, the village of Bolton Percy was held by Malet himself. Later the lordship of the manor fell to the Percy family, as noted by Kirkby's Inquest of 1284. It was at this time that the name of Percy was added to the village's name.

The lordship of the manor passed to the Vesci family, who resided in South Yorkshire near Roche Abbey. In 1290 John, Lord Vesci, contributed towards the marriage of King Edward I's eldest daughter, as was mandated by Lord Vesci's holding of knights fees on his manor of Bolton Percy. The lordship of Bolton Percy next passed to their relatives the Beaumonts on the death of the de Vesci heir. Later the lordship of Bolton Percy passed to the Fairfax family, who were associated with the village for several centuries and whose family memorials can be found in the village church.

The Old Rectory is a Grade II listed William and Mary house, dating from 1698. It was formerly the residence of the Archdeacon of York, and more recently the Bishop of Selby; it is now a private residence.

The village used to have a station on the Dearne Valley Line running from York to Sheffield via Pontefract Baghill and Moorthorpe. The station was closed in 1965.

Geography

The village lies on the road between Appleton Roebuck and Tadcaster to the west of the main East Coast railway line and east of the Trans Pennine railway line. The soil is strong loam that rests on clay.

Governance

The village lies within the Selby & Ainsty Parliamentary constituency. It is also within the Escrick Electoral Division of the North Yorkshire County Council and the Appleton Roebuck Ward of Selby District Council.

The Parish Council covers the nearby village of Colton and Steeton. It has six members, of which three are from Bolton Percy.

Amenities 

The village has a village hall and a public house. The village is served by one bus route from York to Colton. The village has a cricket club that plays in the York & District Senior Cricket league.

Religion

There is a church, All Saints, built in the 15th century by Thomas Parker.

References

External links

Civil parishes in North Yorkshire
Selby District
Villages in North Yorkshire